The Magnificat, in Latin also canticum Beat(issim)ae Virginis Mariae (the song of the (most) Blessed Virgin Mary), is a common part of Christian worship, for instance traditionally included in vespers, evensong or matins. As such it is often sung and was set to music by various composers.

History

In Gregorian chant the Magnificat is sung according to the eight traditional psalm tones:
 Tonus I (first tone): Magnificat primi toni
 Tonus II (second tone): Magnificat secundi toni
 Tonus III (third tone): Magnificat tertii toni
 Tonus IV (fourth tone): Magnificat quarti toni
 Tonus V (fifth tone): Magnificat quinti toni
 Tonus VI (sixth tone): Magnificat sexti toni
 Tonus VII (seventh tone): Magnificat septimi toni
 Tonus VIII (eighth tone): Magnificat octavi toni
Composers, or collections of compositions, referring to or using all eight of the traditional Gregorian psalm tone settings of the Magnificat include the Choirbook, D-Ju MS 20 (various composers), the 35 Magnificats by Palestrina, the Enchiridion utriusque musicae practicae by Georg Rhau, and Johann Pachelbel's Magnificat fugues.

Also the newer psalm tones were used for Magnificat settings:
 Tonus IX (ninth tone or tonus peregrinus): Magnificat noni toni or Magnificat peregrini toni – in Lutheranism this psalm tone became specifically tied to the Magnificat since Luther's translation of the Magnificat, "Meine Seele erhebt den Herren", is usually sung to a German variant of the tonus peregrinus. Later composers referring to the German Magnificat by using this variant of the ninth tone include Dietrich Buxtehude (Magnificat noni toni, BuxWV 205) and Johann Pachelbel with his Chorale preludes Magnificat peregrini toni
 Tonus X (tenth tone): Magnificat decimi toni – for later composers using this see e.g. Psalmi vespertini quatuor vocibus concinendi cum organo ad libitum, Op. 8 by Angelo Berardi (1675)
 Tonus XI (eleventh tone): Magnificat undecimi toni – for later composers using this see e.g. Magnificat compositions by Moritz von Hessen
 Tonus XII (twelfth tone): Magnificat duodecimi toni – for later composers using this see e.g. Magnificat compositions by Moritz von Hessen

Apart from the Magnificat sung to the psalm tones, in Gregorian chant there are also the Magnificat antiphons or O Antiphons inspiring composers like Arvo Pärt.

In seventeenth century polyphony no other religious text, apart from the Mass Ordinary, was set more often than the Magnificat. Often only six out of twelve verses of the Magnificat were set in polyphony, performance alternating verses sung in polyphony and verses sung in monody according to the church tone. In such alternatim settings the even verses were chosen more often for setting in polyphony, because they contained the last verse of the doxology, so that the singing of the Magnificat ended with a piece in polyphony.

Examples of such settings include the sixteen Magnificat settings by Cristóbal de Morales: half of these include only the odd verses ("anima mea" settings), the others only the even verses ("Et exultavit" settings) – both series of eight settings by Morales have one setting per traditional church tone.

From around 1600 such Magnificats are also composed for the organ, e.g. Jean Titelouze's 1626 Le Magnificat ou Cantique de la Vierge pour toucher sur l'orgue suivant les huit tons de l'Église (odd versets).

In the Baroque era the "cantata form" for religious compositions originated in Italy: like masses in the Neapolitan style, Magnificats could be set as a succession of self-contained sections in a variety of styles, choruses alternating with arias for solo singers. Francesco Durante's 1752 Magnificat in A minor is an example of a composition in this style.

In Anglicanism a Magnificat is usually combined with a Nunc dimittis in an (Evening) Service, in which case the English translation of the text ("My soul doth magnify the Lord") is used. For example, Orlando Gibbons composed such Services. In Orthodox Christianity the Magnificat, or "Song of the Theotokos", is sung in the Orthros (matins) as part of the Canon. All-night vigils include the Orthros, and a setting of such vigil thus usually includes the setting of a Magnificat, e.g. the "Canticle of the Theotokos" («Величитъ душа моя Господа», Velichit dusha moya Gospoda, "My soul doth magnify the Lord"), No. 13 in Tchaikovsky's All-Night Vigil.

Table

References

Citations

Sources

 Karl Heinz Illing. Das Magnificat in der protestantischen Kirchenmusik. Kiel, 1933
 
 Gernot Gruber. Parodiemagnificat aus dem Umkreis der Grazer Hofkapelle (1564–1619) in Denkmäler der Tonkunst in Österreich, Volume 133. Graz, 1981

External links
 
 
 
 

Lists of composers